State Highway 317 (SH 317) is a Texas state highway that runs north–south from Valley Mills to the intersection of Interstate 35, Interstate 14, and U.S. Highway 190 in Belton.  This route was designated on May 23, 1939 from Belton to McGregor, with an extension north to Valley Mills on October 29, 1947.

Route description
SH 317 begins at a junction with I-35 and I-14/US 190 in Belton.  It heads northeast from this junction to an intersection with FM 93 as it continues through Belton.  The highway continues to the northeast through Belton to an intersection with FM 439.  Heading towards the northeast, the highway continues to a junction with FM 2305 in Temple.  The highway continues to the northeast through Temple to an intersection with SH 36.  It continues to the northeast to a junction with FM 1237.  As the highway continues to the northeast, it intersects FM 2601.  It heads northeast from this junction to an intersection with FM 107 in Moody.  The highway continues to the northwest to an intersection with FM 2671.  Heading towards the northwest, the highway continues to a junction with US 84 in McGregor.  As the highway continues to the northwest through McGregor, it intersects FM 3047.  It continues to the northwest to a junction with FM 185 in Crawford.  SH 317 reaches its northern terminus at SH 6 in Valley Mills.

Junction list

References

317
Transportation in Bell County, Texas
Transportation in McLennan County, Texas
Transportation in Bosque County, Texas